The Poet Laureate of Nebraska is the poet laureate for the U.S. state of Nebraska.

List of Poets Laureate
 John G. Neihardt (1921-1973)
 William Kloefkorn (1982-2011)
 Twyla M. Hansen (2013-2019)
 Matt Mason (2019-present)

External links
Poets Laureate of Nebraska at the Library of Congress

See also

 Poet laureate
 List of U.S. states' poets laureate
 United States Poet Laureate

References

 
Nebraska culture
American Poets Laureate